Kristina Rakočević (born 13 June 1998) is a Montenegrin athlete specialising in the discus throw. She won a gold medal at the 2016 World U20 Championships.

Her personal best in the discus is 58.30 metres set in Split in 2016. This is the current national record as is her shot put best of 15.38 metres (Bar 2015).

International competitions

References

External links

1998 births
Living people
Montenegrin discus throwers
Athletes (track and field) at the 2014 Summer Youth Olympics
Athletes (track and field) at the 2018 Mediterranean Games
European Games competitors for Montenegro
Athletes (track and field) at the 2015 European Games
Mediterranean Games competitors for Montenegro